Nguyen Thanh Hai (born in 1986), known professionally as Maika Elan, is a freelance photographer born in Hanoi, Vietnam. Elan is known for her first project, The Pink Choice, that focuses on the personal lives of gay couples in Vietnam. In 2013 Elan won first prize in the Contemporary Issues category of World Press Photo with The Pink Choice and was a participant in the Joop Swart masterclass in Amsterdam. She was selected for the VII mentor program from 2014-2016.

Education 
Elan attended the University of Social Sciences and Humanities in Hanoi and studied Sociology.

The Pink Choice 
In 2010, Elan moved from editorial clients and fashion firms to documentary photography. The Pink Choice focused on homosexual couples in everyday life of Vietnam. She was not sure if she wanted to continue her work collecting photographs of gay couples but decided to keep pursuing the project when she noticed the lack of representation on the subject. "None of the pictures she saw revealed the faces of their subjects. Many were shot from the back, and some wore masks. They were stereotypical- even harsh-depictions of love."

The previous representation of the LGBT community in Vietnam was almost non-existent and Maika wanted to make sure they were depicted as real people. After being with each couple for a few days, she realized that they were a lot more comfortable showing love in their homes and decided to take all the photographs in private moments at home where they felt more like they could be themselves and not be criticized by the public outside. Homosexual people face homophobia from society and their families in Vietnam, so the display of real people in real relationships is critical.

Elan stated, “The Pink Choice is a series of photos and the love of homosexual couples which focus on living spaces, the affectionate touches, and more importantly, the synchronized rhythm of lovers sharing life together. Viewers may not feel the personalities of the subjects in the photos, but hopefully they can feel the warmth of their love and caring. In way, I wanted to show what I see of homosexual people and not how they see themselves.”

Elan was awarded “the best photo essay” and the “best single photo” at the Indochina Media Memorial Foundation, in 2010, for The Pink Choice. In 2012, The Pink Choice was a finalist at the Asian Women Photographers Awards. The project also won first prize documentary story at the Pride Photo Awards in 2013. In 2013 Elan won first prize in the Contemporary Issues category of World Press Photo with The Pink Choice.

References

External links

1986 births
Living people
People from Hanoi
Vietnamese women photographers
Vietnamese photographers